The 1998 Pittsburgh Steelers season was the franchise's 66th season as a professional sports franchise and as a member of the National Football League.

This season marked the first time since the 1991 season that the Steelers failed to make the playoffs. Pittsburgh finished 7–9 after starting the season 5–2, losing their last five games to lose a spot in the playoffs. It was Bill Cowher's first losing record as coach of the Steelers.

The season was marked by a controversial ending to the team's Thanksgiving Day game against the Detroit Lions, where Jerome Bettis claimed he called the coin toss in overtime as "tails" although referee Phil Luckett heard "heads." The Lions won 19–16 and started the Steelers' losing streak to finish the season.

The inept plays of Kordell Stewart was cited as another conflict, as the fans slowly began to turn on him. After their 11–5 1997 season, Pittsburgh lost two key offensive components: Chan Gailey, the offensive coordinator who went on to become head coach of the Dallas Cowboys, and their leading receiver, Yancey Thigpen, a Pro Bowler for Pittsburgh in 1997, who joined the Tennessee Oilers.

Offseason

NFL Draft

Personnel

Staff

Notable additions include Hines Ward, Alan Faneca and Deshea Townsend.

Roster

Preseason

Schedule

Regular season

Schedule

Game summaries

Week 1 (Sunday September 6, 1998): at Baltimore Ravens 

at Ravens Stadium, Baltimore, Maryland

 Game time: 1:00 pm EDT
 Game weather: 
 Game attendance: 68,847
 Referee: Walt Coleman
 TV announcers: (CBS) Verne Lundquist (play by play), Randy Cross (color commentator), Michele Tafoya (sideline reporter)

Scoring drives:

 Pittsburgh – FG N. Johnson 27
 Baltimore – FG Stover 41
 Pittsburgh – FG N. Johnson 49
 Pittsburgh – Stewart 1 run (N. Johnson kick)
 Pittsburgh – C. Johnson 20 pass from Stewart (N. Johnson kick)
 Baltimore – FG Stover 25
 Baltimore – J. Lewis 64 pass from Zeier (Stover kick)

Week 2 (Sunday September 13, 1998): vs. Chicago Bears  

at Three Rivers Stadium, Pittsburgh, Pennsylvania

 Game time: 1:00 pm EDT
 Game weather: 84 °F (Sunny)
 Game attendance: 59,084
 Referee: Gerald Austin
 TV announcers: (FOX) Kenny Albert (play by play), Tim Green (color commentator), Dan Jiggetts (sideline reporter)

Scoring drives:

 Chicago – Engram 54 pass from Kramer (kick failed)
 Pittsburgh – Bettis 1 run (N. Johnson kick)
 Chicago – FG Jaeger 19
 Pittsburgh – FG N. Johnson 49
 Pittsburgh – Coleman 13 pass from Stewart (N. Johnson kick)
 Chicago – FG Jaeger 36

Week 3 (Sunday September 20, 1998): at Miami Dolphins  

at Pro Player Stadium, Miami, Florida

 Game time: 1:00 pm EDT
 Game weather: 
 Game attendance: 73,748
 Referee: Bill Carollo
 TV announcers: (CBS) Verne Lundquist (play by play), Randy Cross (color commentator), and Michele Tafoya (sideline reporter)

Scoring drives:

 Miami – Abdul-Jabbar 3 run (Mare kick)
 Miami – L. Thomas 8 pass from Marino (Mare kick)
 Miami – Z. Thomas 17 interception return (Mare kick)

Week 4 (Sunday September 27, 1998): vs. Seattle Seahawks  

at Three Rivers Stadium, Pittsburgh, Pennsylvania

 Game time: 4:05 pm EDT
 Game weather: 83 °F (Partly sunny)
 Game attendance: 58,413
 Referee: Johnny Grier
 TV announcers: (CBS) Kevin Harlan (play by play), Sam Wyche (color commentator)

Scoring drives:

 Pittsburgh – FG N. Johnson 33
 Seattle – Fauria 14 pass from Moon (Peterson kick)
 Pittsburgh – Fuamatu-Ma'afala 10 run (N. Johnson kick)
 Pittsburgh – FG N. Johnson 25
 Seattle – FG Peterson 47

Week 5 (Sunday October 4, 1998): Bye Week

Week 6 (Sunday October 11, 1998): at Cincinnati Bengals  

at Cinergy Field, Cincinnati

 Game time: 1:00 pm EDT
 Game weather: 
 Game attendance: 59,979
 Referee: Tom White
 TV announcers: (CBS) Don Criqui (play by play), Beasley Reece (color commentator)

Scoring drives:

 Pittsburgh – FG N. Johnson 40
 Pittsburgh – Bettis 13 run (N. Johnson kick)
 Cincinnati – FG Pelfrey 44
 Cincinnati – Scott 44 pass from O'Donnell (pass failed)
 Pittsburgh – Huntley 9 run (N. Johnson kick)
 Cincinnati – FG Pelfrey 48
 Cincinnati – Scott 30 pass from O'Donnell (pass failed)
 Pittsburgh – FG N. Johnson 40
 Cincinnati – Pickens 25 pass from O'Donnell (Pelfrey kick)

Week 7 (Sunday October 18, 1998): vs. Baltimore Ravens  

at Three Rivers Stadium, Pittsburgh, Pennsylvania

 Game time: 1:00 pm EDT
 Game weather: 73 °F (Partly sunny)
 Game attendance: 58,620
 Referee: Ron Blum
 TV announcers: (CBS) Kevin Harlan (play by play), Sam Wyche (color commentator)

Scoring drives:

 Pittsburgh – FG N. Johnson 41
 Baltimore – FG Stover 41
 Baltimore – FG Stover 40
 Pittsburgh – C. Johnson 55 pass from Stewart (N. Johnson kick)
 Pittsburgh – FG N. Johnson 42
 Pittsburgh – FG N. Johnson 40

Week 8 (Monday October 26, 1998): at Kansas City Chiefs  

at Arrowhead Stadium, Kansas City, Missouri

 Game time: 8:20 pm EST
 Game weather: 
 Game attendance: 79,431
 Referee: Bernie Kukar
 TV announcers: (ABC) Al Michaels (play by play), Dan Dierdorf & Boomer Esiason (color commentators), Lesley Visser (sideline reporter)

Scoring drives:

 Pittsburgh – McAfee recovered blocked punt in end zone (N. Johnson kick)
 Kansas City – FG Stoyanovich 20
 Kansas City – FG Stoyanovich 28
 Pittsburgh – FG N. Johnson 34
 Pittsburgh – FG N. Johnson 22
 Kansas City – Rison 2 pass from Grbac (Stoyanovich kick)
 Pittsburgh – C. Johnson 5 pass from Stewart (N. Johnson kick)

Week 9 (Sunday November 1, 1998): vs. Tennessee Oilers  

at Three Rivers Stadium, Pittsburgh, Pennsylvania

 Game time: 1:00 pm EST
 Game weather: 55 °F (Cloudy)
 Game attendance: 58,222
 Referee: Mike Carey
 TV announcers: (CBS) Ian Eagle (play by play), Mark May (color commentator)

Scoring drives:

 Tennessee – FG Del Greco 43
 Tennessee – Wycheck 2 pass from McNair (Del Greco kick)
 Pittsburgh – C. Johnson 9 pass from Stewart (N. Johnson kick)
 Tennessee – Dyon 6 pass from McNair (Del Greco kick)
 Tennessee – FG Del Greco 32
 Tennessee – George 37 run (Del Greco kick)
 Tennessee – Davis 29 pass from McNair (Del Greco kick)
 Pittsburgh – Hawkins 3 pass from Stewart (C. Johnson pass from Stewart)
 Tennessee – Marts 27 interception return (Del Greco kick)
 Pittsburgh – C. Johnson 37 pass from Tomczak (C. Johnson pass from Tomczak)
 Pittsburgh – C. Johnson 2 pass from Tomczak (Blackwell pass from Tomczak)

Week 10 (Monday November 9, 1998): vs. Green Bay Packers  

at Three Rivers Stadium, Pittsburgh, Pennsylvania

 Game time: 8:20 pm EST
 Game weather: 44 °F (Mostly cloudy)
 Game attendance: 60,507
 Referee: Ron Winter
 TV announcers: (ABC) Al Michaels (play by play), Dan Dierdorf & Boomer Esiason (color commentators), Lesley Visser (sideline reporter)

Scoring drives:

 Pittsburgh – C. Johnson 8 pass from Stewart (N. Johnson kick)
 Pittsburgh – Stewart 1 run (N. Johnson kick)
 Pittsburgh – FG N. Johnson 45
 Pittsburgh – Fuamatu-Ma'afala 5 run (N. Johnson kick)
 Pittsburgh – FG N. Johnson 21
 Green Bay – FG Longwell 42
 Green Bay – McKenzie 88 fumble return (pass failed)
 Green Bay – Harris 2 run (Freeman pass from Favre)
 Green Bay – FG Longwell 37

Week 11 (Sunday November 15, 1998): at Tennessee Oilers  

at Vanderbilt Stadium, Nashville, Tennessee

 Game time: 1:00 pm EST
 Game weather: 
 Game attendance: 41,104
 Referee: Johnny Grier
 TV announcers: (CBS) Craig Bolerjack (play by play), John Dockery (color commentator)

Scoring drives:

 Tennessee – FG Del Greco 46
 Pittsburgh – Bruener 10 pass from Stewart (George kick)
 Tennessee – Davis 25 pass from McNair (Del Greco kick)
 Pittsburgh – Fuamatu-Ma'afala 26 pass from Stewart (George kick)
 Tennessee – FG Del Greco 24
 Tennessee – FG Del Greco 22
 Tennessee – Roan recovered fumble in end zone (Del Greco kick)

Week 12 (Sunday November 22, 1998): vs. Jacksonville Jaguars  

at Three Rivers Stadium, Pittsburgh, Pennsylvania

 Game time: 1:00 pm EST
 Game weather: 47 °F (Mostly sunny)
 Game attendance: 59,124
 Referee: Walt Coleman
 TV announcers: (CBS) Kevin Harlan (play by play), Sam Wyche (color commentator)

Scoring drives:

 Pittsburgh – Washington 52 interception return (N. Johnson kick)
 Pittsburgh – FG N. Johnson 38
 Pittsburgh – FG N. Johnson 29
 Jacksonville – Taylor 2 run (Hollis kick)
 Pittsburgh – FG N. Johnson 41
 Pittsburgh – Bruener 9 pass from Stewart (N. Johnson kick)
 Jacksonville – J. Smith 33 pass from Brunell (McCardell pass from Brunell)
 Pittsburgh – Washington 78 interception return (N. Johnson kick)

Week 13 (Thursday November 26, 1998): at Detroit Lions  

at Pontiac Silverdome, Pontiac, Michigan

 Game time: 12:30 pm EST
 Game weather: Dome
 Game attendance: 78,139
 Referee: Phil Luckett
 TV announcers: (CBS) Greg Gumbel (play by play), Phil Simms (color commentator), Armen Keteyian (Sideline Reporter)

Scoring drives:

 Pittsburgh – FG N. Johnson 30
 Pittsburgh – FG N. Johnson 38
 Detroit – FG Hanson 45
 Pittsburgh – Blackwell 24 pass from Stewart (N. Johnson kick)
 Detroit – FG Hanson 52
 Detroit – Moore 21 pass from Batch (Hanson kick)
 Detroit – FG Hanson 35
 Pittsburgh – FG N. Johnson 25
 Detroit – FG Hanson 42

Week 14 (Sunday December 6, 1998): vs. New England Patriots  

at Three Rivers Stadium, Pittsburgh, Pennsylvania

 Game time: 1:00 pm EST
 Game weather: 68 °F (Partly sunny)
 Game attendance: 58,632
 Referee: Dick Hantak
 TV announcers: (CBS) Verne Lundquist (play by play), Randy Cross (color commentator), and Michele Tafoya (sideline reporter)

Scoring drives:

 New England – FG Vinatieri 21
 New England – FG Vinatieri 29
 Pittsburgh – FG N. Johnson 49
 New England – Glenn 86 pass from Bledsoe (Vinatieri kick)
 Pittsburgh – FG N. Johnson 26
 Pittsburgh – FG N. Johnson 43
 New England – FG Vinatieri 35
 New England – Edwards 4 run (Vinatieri kick)

Week 15 (Sunday December 13, 1998): at Tampa Bay Buccaneers  

at Raymond James Stadium, Tampa, Florida

 Game time: 1:00 pm EST
 Game weather: 
 Game attendance: 65,335
 Referee: Tony Corrente
 TV announcers: (CBS)  Verne Lundquist (play by play), Randy Cross (color commentator), and Michele Tafoya (sideline reporter)

Scoring drives:

 Pittsburgh – FG N. Johnson 27
 Tampa Bay – FG Husted 39
 Tampa Bay – FG Husted 37
 Tampa Bay – Alstott 3 run (Husted kick)
 Tampa Bay – FG Husted 21

Week 16 (Sunday December 20, 1998): vs. Cincinnati Bengals  

at Three Rivers Stadium, Pittsburgh, Pennsylvania

 Game time: 1:00 pm EST
 Game weather: 42 °F (Cloudy)
 Game attendance: 52,017
 Referee: Bernie Kukar
 TV announcers: (CBS) Ian Eagle (play by play), Mark May (color commentator)

Scoring drives:

 Cincinnati – FG Pelfrey 33
 Cincinnati – Shade 55 fumble return (Pelfrey kick)
 Cincinnati – FG Pelfrey 37
 Pittsburgh – Lake 15 interception return (N. Johnson kick)
 Cincinnati – FG Pelfrey 43
 Pittsburgh – Oldham 54 fumble return (N. Johnson kick)
 Pittsburgh – Bettis 4 run (N. Johnson kick)
 Cincinnati – Scott 61 pass from Blake (bad snap)
 Pittsburgh – FG N. Johnson 22
 Cincinnati – FG Pelfrey 21

Week 17 (Monday December 28, 1998): at Jacksonville Jaguars  

at Alltel Stadium, Jacksonville, Florida

 Game time: 8:20 pm EST
 Game weather: 
 Game attendance: 74,143
 Referee: Bill Carollo
 TV announcers: (ABC) Al Michaels (play by play), Dan Dierdorf & Boomer Esiason (color commentators), Lesley Visser (sideline reporter)

Scoring drives

 Pittsburgh – FG N. Johnson 24
 Jacksonville – Quinn 15 run (Hollis kick)
 Jacksonville – Taylor 9 pass from Quinn (Hollis kick)
 Jacksonville – Taylor 12 run (Hollis kick)

Standings

References

External links
 1998 Pittsburgh Steelers season at Pro Football Reference 
 1998 Pittsburgh Steelers season statistics at jt-sw.com 

Pittsburgh Steelers seasons
Pittsburgh Steelers
Pitts